The New Yalu River Bridge, or Korea-China Amnok River Bridge, is a road bridge across the Amnok River between Dandong, Liaoning Province, China, and Sinuiju, North Korea. Construction began in October 2011 and is mostly complete and connected with Xingdan Road, but the project stalled between 2014 and 2019, with work unfinished on the North Korean side. By 2021, construction on the North Korean side has been mostly completed, with the bridge being expected to open soon.

Construction history
The New Yalu River Bridge was built as a replacement for the Sino–Korean Friendship Bridge, one of two other bridges in the area, to improve travel and trade between the two countries. The Sino–Korean Friendship Bridge, which opened in 1943, is only wide enough for a single rail track and a single reversible lane. It also cannot carry trucks over 20 tonnes.  

Plans to build the New Yalu River Bridge were approved by North Korea during a visit of Chinese Premier Wen Jiabao to the country in 2010. The bridge would be part of a development project including free trade zones on North Korean islands in the Yalu river.

Construction of the New Yalu River Bridge began in 2011, reportedly cost China US$350 million  to complete, and has multiple lanes to carry traffic in both directions.

It was originally planned to open in 2014, but due to delays on the North Korean side, the opening has been postponed indefinitely, as the bridge ended in a field outside of Sinuiju, North Korea. In October 2017, Yonhap reported that North Korea has demanded that "Beijing to cover more of the costs of building the border bridge".

In June 2019, Chinese Communist Party general secretary Xi Jinping pledged to pay for roads and customs posts on the North Korean side of the bridge, according to unnamed sources.

In late September 2019, the construction for road links and customs posts on the North Korean side of the bridge began. By April 2020 the project was reportedly near completion. In mid-August 2020, the project was stopped again. In October 2020, the project works restarted again. 

According to sources cited by South Korean newspaper Dong-a Ilbo, the works were planned to be completed during the first half of 2020, but delayed due to the COVID-19 pandemic. In October 2021, Yonhap reported that the bridge ramps on the Korean side were completed since, and that the bridge would be opened soon, as North Korea would restart border trade.

See also
 Yalu River Broken Bridge
 Ji'an Yalu River Border Railway Bridge
 Amnok River

References

Bridges to nowhere
International bridges
Bridges in North Korea
Bridges in Liaoning
Road-rail bridges
China–North Korea border crossings
Buildings and structures in Dandong
Bridges under construction
AH1
Yalu River